Lois de Banzie (4 May 1930 – 3 April 2021) was a Scottish-born American stage, film, and television actress.

Career

Theatre
De Banzie may be best known for her Drama Desk Award-winning and Tony Award-nominated performance in Paul Osborn's play Morning's at Seven. Her other Broadway credits include The Octette Bridge Club, Da, and The Last of Mrs. Lincoln.

Television
De Banzie also had a prolific career in television and movies, mostly appearing in small-to-mid-sized parts, but with numerous guest roles in various television programs. Her television credits include Baby Talk, Bodies of Evidence, Cheers, Diagnosis: Murder, Family Ties, Home Improvement, Major Dad, Mama's Family, Matlock, Murder, She Wrote, Sisters, Taxi and Who's the Boss? among others.

Film
Her film credits include Addams Family Values, Annie, Arachnophobia, Big Business, Mass Appeal, Sister Act, and Tootsie among others. De Banzie also appeared in several episodes of CBS Radio Mystery Theatre.

Death
De Banzie died in Greenbrae, California on April 3, 2021, at the age of 90.

Her aunt was noted British actress Brenda De Banzie.

Partial filmography

References

External links
 
 

1930 births
2021 deaths
Scottish emigrants to the United States
Scottish film actresses
Scottish stage actresses
Scottish television actresses
Drama Desk Award winners
Actresses from Glasgow